Tony Curran is a Scottish actor who has appeared in Underworld: Evolution, Doctor Who, Roots, and the Netflix historical epic Outlaw King. He appears in the Marvel Cinematic Universe film Thor: The Dark World (2013) as Bor and the second season of Daredevil (2016) as Finn Cooley. In late 2022, Curran starred in the BBC drama Mayflies.

Early life and education
Curran was born in Glasgow, and is a graduate of the Royal Scottish Academy of Music and Drama.

Career
Curran appeared in the BBC television series This Life. Since then, he has appeared in a number of major film and television roles, including Rodney Skinner (The Invisible Man), an original character in The League of Extraordinary Gentlemen. To portray the Invisible Man, he donned a special suit that turned him into a walking bluescreen. (According to his commentary on the DVD, he looked like a "smurf on acid".) He also played vampire roles in Guillermo del Toro's Blade II as Priest and Underworld: Evolution as Markus. In 2006 he appeared in the unrated film Red Road.

Curran participates in marathons to raise money for charity. He is a frequent and popular participant in the annual Dressed to Kilt event in New York City, run by Friends of Scotland in celebration of Tartan Week. He is also a keen fan of Celtic F.C. Curran played the role of Datak Tarr on the Syfy series Defiance and in 2014, he costarred with Diana Vickers in the thriller film Awaiting. In 2016 Curran signed to play 'Callum' in the new E4/Netflix original series Crazyhead.

Curran portrayed Vincent van Gogh in the science fiction television series Doctor Who. The episode, written by Richard Curtis, was rated by Screen Rant as the best of Matt Smith's time as the Doctor. A scene where Curran plays van Gogh, taken into the future to see his work in a modern museum, has been described as one of the most emotional in the entire series. Curran also made a cameo appearance in the Doctor Who episode "The Pandorica Opens".

Curran played Sgt. Pete Twamley in the ITV series Ultimate Force, which was broadcast in over 100 countries.

Curran later worked in season 8 of The Flash where he portrayed Despero in his human form and voiced him in his true alien form starting in the five-part episode "Armageddon". His lead performance in the poignant 2022 BBC drama Mayflies was described by The Guardian as "devastating".

Personal life
In 2012, he married Mai Nguyen; the couple have a daughter. Curran has campaigned for numerous charities throughout his career and in 2021 was named as an official ambassador of the Celtic F.C. Foundation.

Awards
 Evening News National Award — for the role of Devil in the theatre production The Soldier's Tale
 Best Actor at the 2006 British Independent Film Awards for his role in Andrea Arnold's Red Road.
BAFTA Scotland 2006 — Best Actor

Filmography

Film

Television

Video games

References

External links

20th-century Scottish actors
21st-century Scottish actors
Living people
Male actors from Glasgow
Alumni of the Royal Conservatoire of Scotland
Scottish male film actors
Scottish male television actors
Year of birth missing (living people)